Jawahar is a male given name. The most prominent bearer of the name is Jawaharlal Nehru.

People with the given name

 Jawahar Singh
 Jawahar Singh
 Jawahar Lal Kaul
 Jawahar Bakshi

Places

 Jawahar Kala Kendra

Other uses

 Jawahar Navodaya Vidyalaya
 Jawahar Science College
 Jawahar Circle
 Jawahar Tunnel
 Jawahar Lal Nehru University

Indian masculine given names
Masculine given names